Sigiriya Airport  is an air force base and domestic airport located in central Sri Lanka. Located near the city of Dambulla, the airport is also known as SLAF Sigiriya.

History
Sigiriya Airport was first opened in 1942 as an airfield established by the Royal Air Force during World War II. A number of RAF squadrons (8 (1945), 160 (1943-44), 200 (1944-45), 203 (1944-45), 354 (1944)) and other units were stationed at the airfield during and immediately after the war.  With the end of the war, and subsequently no use for the airfield it was abandoned by the RAF in 1946.

On 19 April 1985 the airfield was opened again for the Sri Lanka Air Force by Lalith Athulathmudali, then Minister of National Security and Deputy Minister of Defence, on the invitation of Air Marshal Donald Perera, Commander of the Air Force.

Airlines and destinations

References

Citations

Bibliography

External links
 

Airports in Sri Lanka
Buildings and structures in Matale District
Sri Lanka Air Force bases
Transport in Central Province, Sri Lanka
World War II sites in Sri Lanka
Dambulla